The 1920–21 season was Arsenal's 2nd consecutive season in the top division of English football.

Results
Arsenal's score comes first

Legend

Football League First Division

Final League table

FA Cup

See also

 1920–21 in English football
 List of Arsenal F.C. seasons

References

English football clubs 1920–21 season
1920-21